National Union of Mineworkers may refer to:

National Union of Mineworkers (Great Britain)
National Union of Mineworkers (South Africa)

See also
 Mine Workers' Union (disambiguation)